Miguel Luis Guevara Trelles (born 4 June 1968) is a Peruvian politician and a former Congressman representing Piura for the 2006–2011 term. Guevara belongs to the Peruvian Aprista Party.

External links
Official Congressional Site

Living people
American Popular Revolutionary Alliance politicians
Members of the Congress of the Republic of Peru
1968 births